King Charles III has received numerous titles, decorations, and honorary appointments, both during his time as heir apparent to Queen Elizabeth II of the United Kingdom and the other Commonwealth realms, and as king of multiple countries.

Royal and noble titles and styles

1948  6 February  1952: His Royal Highness Prince Charles of Edinburgh
 6 February 1952  26 July 1958: His Royal Highness The Duke of Cornwall
 in Scotland: 6 February 1952  8 September 2022: His Royal Highness The Duke of Rothesay
 26 July 1958  8 September 2022: His Royal Highness The Prince of Wales
 8 September 2022  present: His Majesty The King

Upon the accession of his mother as queen, Charles, as the eldest son of the monarch, automatically became, in England, the Duke of Cornwall and, in Scotland, the Duke of Rothesay, Earl of Carrick, Baron of Renfrew, Lord of the Isles, and Prince and Great Steward of Scotland. His eldest son, Prince William, automatically received these titles on Charles's accession as king.
Upon the accession of his mother as queen, Charles, as the eldest son of the monarch, automatically became, in England, the Duke of Cornwall and, in Scotland, the Duke of Rothesay, Earl of Carrick, Baron of Renfrew, Lord of the Isles, and Prince and Great Steward of Scotland. As such, he was styled "His Royal Highness The Duke of Cornwall", except in Scotland, where he was known as "His Royal Highness The Duke of Rothesay" instead.

In 1958, letters patent from the then sovereign made Charles the Prince of Wales and Earl of Chester and, on 1 July 1969, Charles was invested as such during the a ceremony in which a coronet and robes were placed on him. In 2021, upon the death of his father, Prince Philip, Charles furthermore inherited the titles Duke of Edinburgh, Earl of Merioneth, and Baron Greenwich. When he became the British sovereign himself on 8 September 2022, these titles merged with the Crown.

Regnal name
In an announcement following the death of Queen Elizabeth II, Prime Minister Liz Truss referred to Charles as King Charles III, the first official usage of that name. Shortly afterwards Clarence House confirmed that he would use the regnal name Charles III.

There had previously been speculation that he might choose a different name, because the previous two monarchs named Charles are both associated with negative events in royal history: Charles I was beheaded in 1649 and Charles II reigned during the Great Plague and the Great Fire of London. The name Charles III is also associated with the Jacobite pretender, Charles Edward Stuart, who claimed the throne under that name in the 18th century. The most discussed alternative regnal name had been George VII, in honour of Charles' maternal grandfather; although, prior to succeeding to the throne, Charles denied discussing a regnal name at all.

Full style

Antigua and Barbuda
His Majesty Charles the Third, by the Grace of God, King of Antigua and Barbuda and His other Realms and Territories, Head of the Commonwealth.

Australia
His Majesty Charles the Third, by the Grace of God, King of Australia and His other Realms and Territories, Head of the Commonwealth.

Bahamas
His Majesty Charles the Third, by the Grace of God, King of the Commonwealth of The Bahamas and of His other Realms and Territories King, Head of the Commonwealth.

Belize
His Majesty Charles the Third, by the Grace of God, King of Belize and of His other Realms and Territories, Head of the Commonwealth.

Canada

English: His Majesty Charles the Third, by the Grace of God of the United Kingdom, Canada and His other Realms and Territories King, Head of the Commonwealth, Defender of the Faith.

French:

Grenada
His Majesty Charles the Third, by the Grace of God, King of Grenada and of His other Realms and Territories, Head of the Commonwealth.

Jamaica
His Majesty Charles the Third, by the Grace of God of Jamaica and of His other Realms and Territories King, Head of the Commonwealth.

New Zealand
English: His Majesty Charles the Third, by the Grace of God, King of New Zealand and His Other Realms and Territories, Head of the Commonwealth, Defender of the Faith.

Māori:

Papua New Guinea
His Majesty Charles the Third, King of Papua New Guinea and His other Realms and Territories, Head of the Commonwealth.

Saint Christopher and Nevis
His Majesty Charles the Third, by the Grace of God, King of Saint Christopher and Nevis and of His other Realms and Territories, Head of the Commonwealth.

Saint Lucia
His Majesty Charles the Third, by the Grace of God, King of Saint Lucia and of His other Realms and Territories, Head of the Commonwealth.

Saint Vincent and the Grenadines
His Majesty Charles the Third, by the Grace of God, King of Saint Vincent and the Grenadines and His other Realms and Territories, Head of the Commonwealth.

Solomon Islands
His Majesty Charles the Third, by the Grace of God, King of Solomon Islands and His other Realms and Territories, Head of the Commonwealth.

Tuvalu
His Majesty Charles the Third, by the Grace of God, King of Tuvalu and of His other Realms and Territories, Head of the Commonwealth.

United Kingdom

English: His Majesty Charles the Third, by the Grace of God, of the United Kingdom of Great Britain and Northern Ireland and of His other Realms and Territories King, Head of the Commonwealth, Defender of the Faith

Welsh: 

Unofficial
Canada

 1977:
In Blackfoot: MekaistoIn English: Chief Red Crow

 1986: Leading Star

 1976:
In Inuktitut: Attaniout IkeneegoIn English: The Son of the Big Boss (loosely translates to heir apparent)

 2001:
In Cree: Pisimwa KamiwohkitahpamikohkIn English: The Sun Looks at Him in a Good Way

Africa

 2011:
In Maasai: Oloishiru IngishiIn English: The Helper of the Cows (literally he whom the cows love so much they call for him when they are in times of distress)

 Oceania 

 1952 :
In Tok Pisin: Nambawan pikinini bilong Misis KwinIn English: The number one child belonging to Mrs Queen 2018: High Chief Mal MenaringmanuMilitary ranks and appointments

  2009 – 2022: Vice-Admiral in the Royal Canadian Navy
  2009 – 2022: Lieutenant-General in the Canadian Army
  2009 – 2022: Lieutenant-General in the Royal Canadian Air Force

 2015 – present: Admiral of the Fleet of the Royal New Zealand Navy
 2015 – present: Field Marshal of the New Zealand Army
 2015 – present: Marshal of the Royal New Zealand Air Force

  8 March 1971 – 1 January 1977: Flight Lieutenant in the Royal Air Force
  15 September 1971 – 1 September 1972: Acting Sub-Lieutenant in the Royal Navy
  1 September 1972 – 27 July 1973: Sub-Lieutenant in the Royal Navy
  27 July 1973 – 1 January 1977: Lieutenant in the Royal Navy
  1 January 1977 – 14 November 1988: Commander in the Royal Navy
  1 January 1977 – 14 November 1988: Wing Commander in the Royal Air Force
  14 November 1988 – 14 November 1998: Captain in the Royal Navy
  14 November 1988 – 14 November 1998: Group Captain in the Royal Air Force
  14 November 1998 – 14 November 2002: Rear-Admiral in the Royal Navy
  14 November 1998 – 14 November 2002: Major-General in the British Army
  14 November 1998 – 14 November 2002: Air Vice-Marshal in the Royal Air Force
  14 November 2002 – 14 November 2006: Vice-Admiral in the Royal Navy
  14 November 2002 – 14 November 2006: Lieutenant-General in the British Army
  14 November 2002 – 14 November 2006: Air Marshal in the Royal Air Force
  14 November 2006 – 16 June 2012: Admiral in the Royal Navy
  14 November 2006 – 16 June 2012: General in the British Army
  14 November 2006 – 16 June 2012: Air Chief Marshal in the Royal Air Force
  16 June 2012 – present: Admiral of the Fleet in the Royal Navy 
  16 June 2012 – present: Field Marshal in the British Army 
  16 June 2012 – present: Marshal of the Royal Air Force in the Royal Air Force
  28 October 2022 – present: Captain General Royal Marines

University degrees

Commonwealth of Nations 
Titles
On 20 April 2018, the Commonwealth Heads of Government agreed that Charles would succeed his mother as Head of the Commonwealth, and he did so following her death.

Commonwealth realms
Appointments (Shown in order in which appointments were made, not order of precedence)

Decorations and medals (Shown in order in which appointments were made, not order of precedence)

Awards

 Other Commonwealth countries 

Appointments

Foreign honours
Appointments

 Decorations 

Wear of orders, decorations, and medals
The ribbons worn regularly by Charles in undress uniform are as follows:

With medals, Charles normally wears the breast stars of the Garter, Thistle, and Bath. When only one should be worn, he wears the Order of the Garter star, except in Scotland where the Scottish Order of the Thistle star is worn. Foreign honours are worn in accordance with British customs and traditions when applicable.

Honorary military appointments

  1977 –: Colonel-in-Chief of the Royal Australian Armoured Corps

  1977 –: Colonel-in-Chief of Lord Strathcona's Horse (Royal Canadians) With effect from 11 June 1977.
  1977 –: Colonel-in-Chief of the Royal Winnipeg Rifles
  1977 –: Colonel-in-Chief of the Royal Regiment of Canada
  1985 –: Colonel-in-Chief of the Royal Canadian Dragoons With effect from 17 September 1985.
  2004 –: Colonel-in-Chief of the Black Watch (Royal Highland Regiment) of Canada
  2005 –: Colonel-in-Chief of the Toronto Scottish Regiment (Queen Elizabeth The Queen Mother's Own)
  2022 –: Colonel-in-Chief of the Governor General's Horse Guards
  1977 –: Colonel-in-Chief of the Air Reserve Group
  2012 –: Honorary Commissioner of the Royal Canadian Mounted Police
  2015 –: Commodore-in-Chief of the Royal Canadian Navy (Fleet Atlantic)
  2022 –: Honorary Canadian Ranger

  1977 –: Air Commodore-in-Chief of the Royal New Zealand Air Force With effect from 11 June 1977.

  1984 –: Colonel-in-Chief of the Royal Pacific Islands Regiment

  1969 – 2006: Colonel-in-Chief of the Royal Regiment of Wales
  1975 – 2022: Colonel, Welsh Guards With effect from 1 March 1975.
  1977 – 2007: Colonel-in-Chief of the Cheshire Regiment Appointment ceased with effect from 1 September 2007 upon the regiment's merger into the Merceican Regiment.
  1977 – 1994: Colonel-in-Chief of the Gordon Highlanders Appointment ceased with effect from the raising of the successor, merged regiments (ultimately this occurred in 1994 - effectively the appointment was transferred to the new units).
  1977 – 1994: Colonel-in-Chief of the 2nd King Edward VII's Own Gurkha Rifles (The Sirmoor Rifles)
  1977 –: Colonel-in-Chief of the Parachute Regiment
  1985 – 1992: Colonel-in-Chief of the 5th Royal Inniskilling Dragoon Guards
  1992 –: Colonel-in-Chief of the Royal Dragoon Guards With effect from 14 February 1992 less Royal Gurkha Rifles and the Highlanders where the new appointment was upon the raising of the new regiments (ultimately this occurred in 1994).
  1992 –: Colonel-in-Chief of the Army Air Corps
  1994 –: Colonel-in-Chief of the Royal Gurkha Rifles
  1994 – 2006: Deputy Colonel-in-Chief of the Highlanders (Seaforth, Gordons and Camerons)
  2000 –: Royal Honorary Colonel of the Queen's Own Yeomanry With effect from 17 June 2000.
  2003 –: Colonel-in-Chief of The Queen's Dragoon Guards With effect from 19 August 2003.
  2003 – 2006: Colonel-in-Chief of the King's Regiment
  2003 – 2006: Colonel-in-Chief of the Black Watch (Royal Highland Regiment)
  2006 –: Royal Colonel of the Black Watch, 3rd Battalion, The Royal Regiment of Scotland
  2006 –: Royal Colonel of the 51st Highland, 7th Battalion, The Royal Regiment of Scotland
  2007 –: Colonel in Chief of the Mercian Regiment
  2022 –: Colonel-in-Chief of the Life Guards
  2022 –: Colonel-in-Chief of the Blues and Royals
  2022 –: Colonel-in-Chief of the Grenadier Guards
  2022 –: Colonel-in-Chief of the Coldstream Guards
  2022 –: Colonel-in-Chief of the Scots Guards
  2022 –: Colonel-in-Chief of the Irish Guards
  2022 –: Colonel-in-Chief of the Welsh Guards
  1993 –: Honorary Air Commodore of Royal Air Force Valley With effect from 6 April 1993.
  2006 –: Commodore-in-Chief of Plymouth, Royal Naval Command
  2006 –: Honorary Commodore of Her Majesty's Coastguard
  2019 –: Commodore-in-Chief, Aircraft Carriers
  2022 –: Captain General Royal Marines

Non-national titles and honours

Member and fellowships

Scholastic
 Chancellor, visitor, governor, and fellowships

Honorary degrees 

Freedom of the City

  5 July 1969: Cardiff
  1970: Royal Borough of Windsor and Maidenhead
  1971: LondonArchived at Ghostarchive and the Wayback Machine: 
  1977: Calgary
  3 April 1979: Portsmouth
  8 June 1989: Northampton
  24 May 1994: Swansea
  24 October 2002: Ripon

 Foreign 
  2011: Madrid
  2021: Athens

Honorific eponyms

Geographic locations
  Australian Antarctic Territory: Prince Charles Mountains
 : Prince Charles Strait

Structures

Buildings
 : Prince Charles Park, Nadi
 : Prince of Wales Hospital, Sha Tin
 : The Prince Charles Hospital, Brisbane
Former
 : Prince of Wales Building, Admiralty (renamed in 1997)

Awards
Prince of Wales Prize for Municipal Heritage Leadership

Species
 : Hyloscirtus princecharlesi'', or the Prince Charles Stream Tree Frog

Interest awards

See also 
 Style of the British sovereign
 Title and style of the Canadian monarch
 List of titles and honours of Camilla, Queen Consort
 List of titles and honours of William, Prince of Wales
 List of titles and honours of Catherine, Princess of Wales
 List of titles and honours of Anne, Princess Royal
 List of titles and honours of Queen Elizabeth II
 List of titles and honours of Prince Philip, Duke of Edinburgh
 List of titles and honours of King George VI
 List of titles and honours of Queen Elizabeth The Queen Mother
 List of titles and honours of Mary of Teck
 List of titles and honours of Prince Arthur, Duke of Connaught and Strathearn
 List of honours of the British Royal Family by country

Notes

References 

Charles III
Charles of Wales
British monarchy-related lists
Commonwealth royal styles

Knights of the Garter
Knights of the Thistle
Knights Grand Cross of the Order of the Bath
Knights of the Order of Australia
Members of the Order of Merit
Members of the Saskatchewan Order of Merit
Companions of the Order of Canada
Commanders of the Order of Military Merit (Canada)
Order of Saint Olav
Order of the White Rose of Finland
Knights Grand Cross of the Order of Orange-Nassau
Grand Crosses of the Order of the Crown (Netherlands)
Grand Croix of the Légion d'honneur
Commanders of the Order of Agricultural Merit
Grand Crosses of the Order of Aviz
Grand Crosses of the Order of the Star of Romania
Honorary Companions of the Order of the Star of Ghana
Recipients of the Order of Freedom of Barbados